Vexillum crispum is a species of small sea snail, a marine gastropod mollusk in the family Costellariidae, the ribbed miters.

Description

Distribution

References

crispum
Gastropods described in 1872